Tripterophycis is a genus of morid cods.

Species
The currently recognized species in this genus are:
 Tripterophycis gilchristi Boulenger, 1902 (grenadier cod)
 Tripterophycis svetovidovi Sazonov & Shcherbachev, 1986 (brown grenadier cod)

References

Moridae